Aragam is a village in the Himalayan region of North Kashmir, located about  from Srinagar on the route from Srinagar to Bandipore. Aragam is located on the banks of Wular Lake and surrounded by wooded mountains on three sides. The location/village code is 002767. Aragam village is located in Bandipora Tehsil of Bandipore district in Jammu and Kashmir, India.

Demography 
Aragam has a total population of 3,020 with about 505 houses.

History 
The village derives its name from a stream ("Ara") which flows through the village. Adjacent to the village are Animbar, Fakhnar and Langmarg forests that are known for their vast grazing grounds and possess a lively pastoral life during summers. The surrounding mountains also support pine and deodar forests, while as apple, cherry, walnut, chinar, and popular trees can be spotted in the village lands. Rice constitutes the main staple crop of the village although isolated paddy, maize and some oilseed are also grown in some pockets.

Education 
Education has always thrived in the village and the village is known to possess one of the oldest schools in the district, which was later upgraded to a Higher Secondary level. Aragam is also known to have the oldest grand mosque in the area besides a Hindu temple as well.

Notable people 

 Lala Aragami, poet and Sufi

Gallery 

Himalayas
Villages in Bandipora district